Hugo Giorgi (born 23 January 1920) is an Argentine former footballer who played as a forward in clubs of Chile and Italy. He was born in Coronel Bogado.

Clubs
 Audax Italiano 1940–1947
 Bologna 1947–1949

Honours
Audax Italiano
 Chilean championship: 1946

Individual
 Chilean championship top scorer: 1945

External links
 

1920 births
Possibly living people
Argentine footballers
Association football forwards
Audax Italiano footballers
Bologna F.C. 1909 players
Argentine expatriate footballers
Argentine expatriate sportspeople in Chile
Expatriate footballers in Chile
Argentine expatriate sportspeople in Italy
Expatriate footballers in Italy